Department of State commonly refers to the United States Department of State. Other uses include:

United States
 New Hampshire Department of State
 New York State Department of State
 Pennsylvania Department of State
 Puerto Rico Department of State

Elsewhere
 Department of State (Ireland)
 Department of State Affairs, a translation of Shangshu Sheng, an executive institution of imperial China (ca. 206 BC – 1368 AD)

See also
 
 Secretary of state (U.S. state government)